Euclasta varii is a species of moth in the family Crambidae. The species is found in Spain, Algeria, Tunisia, Libya, Angola, the Democratic Republic of Congo, Malawi, Mozambique, Senegal, Sierra Leone, South Africa, Tanzania,
Zimbabwe, Zambia and Yemen.

In southern Europe and in the Maghreb countries, there are two generations per year with adults on wing from May/June to August/October.

The larvae feed on Periploca laevigata.

References

Moths described in 1973
Pyraustinae
Lepidoptera of West Africa
Moths of Africa
Lepidoptera of the Democratic Republic of the Congo
Moths of the Arabian Peninsula
Lepidoptera of Mozambique
Lepidoptera of Angola
Lepidoptera of Malawi
Lepidoptera of Tanzania
Lepidoptera of Zambia
Lepidoptera of Zimbabwe
Lepidoptera of South Africa
Insects of North Africa